Bremmer may refer to:

Henk Bremmer, Dutch art critic
Ian Bremmer, political scientist and president of Eurasia Group
Jan N. Bremmer, Dutch academic and historian
Richard Bremmer, a British actor
Rolf Bremmer, a Dutch scholar

See also
 Bremer (disambiguation)